The web address suffix .jp is the Internet country code top-level domain (ccTLD) for Japan. It was established in 1986 and is administered by the Japan Registry Services.

History
At the establishment of the .jp domain, the domain was administered by the JPNIC, as part of their role as an overseeing technical body for the Internet in Japan. It was originally proposed by Jun Murai for the Information Sciences Institute at the University of Southern California on August 5, 1986. Handling of the domain was first managed within the "junet-admin" admin group, which was responsible for the operations of JUNET, an early computer network in which Murai was a part of.

In April 1989, the junet-admin group began formally registering .jp domain names. However, due to the growing importance and size of the .jp registry, it was decided at the 11th General Meeting of JPNIC in December 2000 to create a new corporation that would manage the .jp domain.  Thus, the Japan Registry Service was created, and on June 30, 2003, officially assumed the duties of the .jp registry.

.jp registrations are only allowed if the registrant has a physical address in Japan. Registrations are processed via accredited registrars and domain names with Japanese characters (kanji, hiragana or katakana) may be registered at the second level.

Second-level domains
While any party with a Japanese mailing address can get a second-level domain (example.jp) there are several restricted-use second-level domains, listed below.

 ac.jp: higher level academic institutions, such as universities
 ad.jp: JPNIC members
 co.jp: most forms of incorporated companies, including foreign companies registered in Japan
 ed.jp: educational institutions for individuals under 18
 go.jp: Japanese government ministries and their endeavours
 gr.jp: groups of two or more people, or groups of registered companies
 lg.jp: local government authorities
 ne.jp: network service providers
 or.jp: registered organizations and non-profit organizations

Geographical type jp domain names 
(organization).(cityname).(prefecturename).jp

Domains listed below are reserved for the local governments in Japan:
 metro.tokyo.jp: reserved for the government of Tokyo Metropolis
 pref.(prefecturename).jp: reserved for the prefectural government
 city.(cityname).jp: reserved for cities designated by government ordinance
 city.(cityname).(prefecturename).jp: reserved for non-designated cities and, wards and cities within Tokyo
 town.(townname).(prefecturename).jp: reserved for towns
 vill.(villagename).(prefecturename).jp: reserved for villages

Internationalized top-level domains
Japan has considered registering an internationalized country code top-level domain, .日本. 
In 2008, a preliminary application was made.
 no such domain has been registered.

Private companies have registered the following internationalized generic top-level domains using Japanese script:

, the most used Japanese script top-level domain

Cities or regions in Japan have registered these geographic top-level domains:

.kyoto (Kyoto)
.nagoya (Nagoya)
.okinawa (Okinawa)
.osaka (Osaka)
.ryukyu (Ryukyu, a former kingdom, often used as a traditional alias of Okinawa)
.tokyo (Tokyo)
.yokohama (Yokohama)

See also
 Domain Name System
 Country code top-level domain

References

External links
 IANA .jp whois information
 JPRS website
 JPNIC website
 .jp accredited registrars (in Japanese only)

Internet properties established in 1986
Council of European National Top Level Domain Registries members
Country code top-level domains
Internet in Japan
Domain names of Japan
Computer-related introductions in 1986
1986 establishments in Japan